The Unholy Alliance (literally "Alliance") is an action crime-thriller television drama created by Jazz Boon and TVB. Principal photography began in Hong Kong in September 2016, and continued in Taiwan in December 2016. It premiered on TVB Jade on 7 August 2017, and for MediaCorp's Channel U in July 2019, and ran for 28 episodes.

Boon has described The Unholy Alliance as a Mission: Impossible-style action thriller that features modern martial arts, including MMA, Brazilian jiu-jitsu, Krav Maga and gun fu. It stars Nina Paw, Ruco Chan, Nancy Wu, Joel Chan, Elaine Yiu, Kwok Fung, Jimmy Au, KK Cheung, and Elena Kong. The Unholy Alliance follows a modern Hong Kong crime family, led by the matriarch Ling Hung (Paw).

Synopsis
Surfer Ko Tsz-kit and his adoptive mother Mei run a B&B in Taiwan. Yuen Ching Yan who appeared as an agile backpacker meets Tsz Kit while biking on the same lane and then when she is supposedly harassed by drug addicts at the beach, where Tsz Kit happens to teach surfing lessons, Tsz Kit saves her and brings her back to their B&B. Ching Yan would eventually be living with them including she convinced Mei and Tsz Kit to also let her help out Tsz Kit with teaching surfing lessons for a reduced rent price living at their B&B and even began to help out with servicing their customers at their B&B business. Very soon, their B&B becomes ambushed by assassins, which Ching Yan and Mei realized on time when they noticed the premises being surrounded by the assassins and then to Tsz Kit's surprising terrifying reaction, his adoptive mother Mei tosses a kitchen knife, which injured/killed one of the assassins and the agile backpacker Yuen Ching Yan brought out her gun shooting another assassin. The ambush battle then begins with Ching Yan shooting against the assassins coming in and then Mei brings out her gun from the kitchen counter and also starts firing against the assassins. Ching Yan and Mei then surround a terrified Tsz Git to protect him firing their guns against the assassins invading in and then ran into a safe house basement, where Mei and Ching Yan began grabbing weapons getting ready to fire back at assassins that have surrounded the premises and during this moment Tsz Kit is confused and questioning why Mei knows how to use a gun and why there is a secret safe house. Mei responded to not ask so many questions and must leave including Mei revealed she knew Ching Yan's real status as a bodyguard/assassin for them recalling how Ching Yan was able to manage holding an extreme hot scolding bowl of congee without using a tray to put it under to serve a customer at the B&B, revealing she was trained to manage high temperature items on her hands as part of being an assassin and then as they are escaping outside, they are firing their guns against the assassins and Mei brings Tsz Kit into a bullet proof car and while escaping on the road, Tsz Kit begins asking questions about what their real statuses are and why there was an ambush, but Mei refused to answer and informed him she would be taking him to a new safe location to start a new life and it was best he did not know a lot. Unfortunately, Mei had suffered a gunshot wound and then the car crashes causing Mei to be trapped and unable to get out, which Tsz Kit was attempting to try to get her out, but then one of the assassins riding on a motorcycle is shooting at them causing the car's motor to catch fire, but luckily Ching Yan arrived on a motorcycle and shot the assassin, but with Mei being trapped and seriously hurt and knowing she cannot get out including the car was about to explode, she tells Tsz Kit to not seek answers to his real identity or the truth and to not get revenge for her and told him to run away immediately as far as possible. Mei then passes out and luckily Ching Yan saves Tsz Kit before Mei's car exploded, which killed Mei and then brought him into her car informing him that he is to stay with her if he wants to stay safe and to follow her orders. However, Tsz Kit ignored her orders and manages to escape and when he returns to their B&B, he discovered it was bombed, but found a clue that his adoptive mother Mei left behind that led him to a buddhist temple finding a box with a lot of American Cash and several fake passports for different countries with different names and they all had Tsz Kit's picture on it including there were weapons in there that were disguised as beauty products. Tsz Kit realized Mei had arranged all of this in case if an ambush was to happen, he can use the passports to escape and have money to use and use the disguised weapons to protect himself.

To probe into the matter, Tsz-kit uses the Hong Kong Passport his adoptive mother Mei had arranged and arrives to Hong Kong alone. With his best friend Tai Wah-koon pulling a few strings for him, Tsz-kit uncovers that his adoptive mother's death is connected to Ling Hung, a mafia leader running multiple syndicates, who is so powerful that her decision will lead to a profound impact on the economy and livelihoods of the communities. Ling Hung has been known in Hong Kong to be one of the most ruthless and powerful tough mafia bosses in the underground mafia society, but she has a good warm-hearted side of her personality and being charitable when it came to family and being around normal average people. Tsz Kit notices that Ling Hung looks very much like his adoptive mother Mei, which raised Tsz Kit's suspicions even much more.

It is soon revealed that Ching Yan was hired as a bodyguard by Ling Hung to protect Tsz Kit in Taiwan and when Ching Yan eventually catches up with Tsz Kit in Hong Kong, she orders him to stay with her and informed it is her job to protect him. At times, he manages to escape from Ching Yan's surveillance trying to find an opportunity to confront Ling Hung about his adoptive mother's death, but eventually Ling Hung had no choice, but to give in to explaining to Tsz Kit what happened and her relationship with his adoptive mother Mei. It was revealed that while Ling Hung was being ambushed in Hong Kong with her bodyguard Yik Fung and her adoptive son Kent Ling protecting her, the ambush that Tsz Kit and Mei experienced in Taiwan with Ching Yan involved also happened at the same time.

It is later revealed Ling Hung is Tsz Kit's biological mother and that his adoptive mother Mei many years earlier had become good friends with Ling Hung. Mei and Ling Hung came from the same working-class neighborhood having their own stands on the street selling food products coincidentally on the same street, but they would soon have their own store business together. This time period was taking place approximately sometime in the late 1970s to early 1980s as the scene showed them meeting for the first time with Paula Tsui's song Seasons of The Wind(released in Hong Kong in 1981-82) playing in the background. Ling Hung's father passed away when she was at a very young age leaving her mother to be single and having to raise Ling Hung and her younger siblings Ling Hei(sister) and Lit(brother) living in a small apartment growing up being poor. Around the same time period when Ling Hung and Mei became great friends, Ling Hung's brother Lit became obsessed with wanting to make quick money and he joined an underground business as a young man, which Ling Hung and her mother tried to talk him out of, but he refused to listen. Very soon Lit gets into dangerous trouble, which involved Ling Hung and Mei trying to save him, but unfortunately this causes them to come into more complicated dangerous situations and the wrong kind of people, which resulted in them accidentally stepping into the mafia business and eventually Ling Hung's involvement in illegal business would lead her to have her own business with her being the leader. In Ling Hung's early stages of her illegal business during the 1980s, Ling Hung and her friend Mei including Yik Fung, who was their business partner, but now Ling Hung's bodyguard often got into gun battles with other gangs, which explains why Mei knew how to fire a gun when there was an ambush at the B&B.

During Ling Hung's early years of her illegal business, she was seriously hurt in gang violence at one period, which required her to be in hiding in Lantau Island from rival gangs as she needed significant time to recover from her injuries. During Ling Hung's time in hiding at Lantau Island, Mei was impersonating Ling Hung running the mafia business to protect it from being threatened by rival gangs, which Ling Hung was unaware of until Mei and Yik Fung came to visit her in Lantau Island and then Mei explained to Ling Hung that when she had made a request to Ling Hung two years earlier to allow her to leave the mafia society due to supposedly having enough of the blood battles, the reality was that she secretly had undergone plastic surgery to look like Ling Hung, which Yik Fung helped arrange. Mei's goal was to be Ling Hung's body double running and protecting the mafia business in needed desperate situations like this one and she was willing to sacrifice her life to allow Ling Hung to leave the mafia society to return to a normal safe life. This explains why Mei and Ling Hung looked like twin sisters even though they were not biologically related. While Mei was impersonating Ling Hung and leading the mafia business, Ling Hung was in hiding trying live a normal life in Lantau Island where she soon met a man immediately falling in love with him, who would soon impregnate Ling Hung giving birth to a male baby naming him Tsz Kit sometime in the mid to late 1980s. Unfortunately, Ling Hung's return to normal life was short lived after rival gangs found out the real Ling Hung was hiding in Lantau Island and there was an ambush once again, which involved Ling Hung's love of her life being killed in the process. Ling Hung is forced to give up her infant son Tsz Kit, which Mei took into her care and left for Taiwan to protect Tsz Kit from the dangerous violent mafia life. Ling Hung had no choice, but to return to the underground Hong Kong mafia business. Since she was accidentally forced in the mafia business, in order for her to survive and protect her family, she had to learn how to be ruthless and vicious when battling against enemies and later this would result in her business to grow to be very powerful over the next several decades running many large financial and real estate businesses in Hong Kong including some internationally and would become the head chairperson of the mafia alliance while Mei was raising and protecting Tsz Kit in Taiwan running a B&B. While Mei was raising Tsz Kit in Taiwan, Ling Hung from Hong Kong continued to remain in touch with Mei on what was happening with Tsz Kit's daily life and how she can make arrangements to provide needed resources to Mei to raise Tsz Kit, which Yik Fung would be the one to help with making the arrangements often by traveling to Taiwan to check in on Mei. In addition, Ling Hung would buy birthday gifts every year for Tsz Kit with Yik Fung being the one to travel to Taiwan to give to Mei for Tsz Kit.

In the beginning, Tsz Kit was angry at Ling Hung for being involved in the underground mafia society, which resulted in his adoptive mother being killed. Tsz Kit was brought to a buddhist temple by Ching Yan under Yik Fung's and Ling Hung's orders, where Mei's ashes were now interred in a resting place, which Yik Fung arranged for Mei's cremation and brought her ashes from Taiwan back to Hong Kong. Ling Hung and Yik Fung had arrived to the temple before Tsz Kit and Ching Yan did and in that moment Ling Hung was facing Mei's resting place thanking her for taking Tsz Kit to Taiwan more than 30 years earlier hoping that if they are not by Ling Hung's side, they would live safer simpler lives, but felt like she failed them as they were eventually ambushed and could not believe she was meeting Mei again in this form. Tsz Kit and Ching Yan then arrived to the temple to pay his respects to his adoptive mother and eventually he saw Ling Hung and Yik Fung in the same room realizing they arranged all of this and then he confronted Ling Hung with a lot of anger and promised that he would leave Hong Kong to live a safe normal life and never to see Ling Hung ever again. However, when there was an ambush happening against Ling Hung in a parking lot at the same building of where she was attending a musical event, which Tsz Kit found out about, he realized he could not stand to see his own mother be in danger and thanks to the fact he had some training from Ching Yan on how to use a gun, he came to save Ling Hung. But due to the fact that her bodyguard Yik Fung was involved with trying to save Ling Hung's nephew Ricky from a potential setup ambush earlier in the day, he was caught by police and at the police station's jailhouse at the time of the ambush and with Ching Yan not arriving into the parking lot yet to save Ling Hung as she was still caught in battling against the assassins in another part of the building and Ling Hung's adoptive son Kent Ling not available on site, Ling Hung and Tsz Kit who happened to come across guns lying around in the parking lot had no choice, but to defend themselves and they were rushing through the parking lot fiercely firing their guns against the assassins coming after them, which eventually ended and they were saved thanks to the law enforcement arriving to the scene. At this point, Tsz Kit decided to stay in Hong Kong realizing he could not live with the fact of leaving his own mother behind to let her live a dangerous life and wanted to protect her. Initially, Ling Hung was against his decision to stay behind in Hong Kong and warned him he could lose his life, but realizing Tsz Kit would never leave, she allows him to stay. Tsz Kit began learning how to use a gun and taking self-defense lessons with Ching Yan and even became Ling Hung's bodyguard to protect her. Ling Hung then slowly promoted Tsz Kit into working for her company starting off as an information file storage manager and later on he would become Ling Hung's assistant chairperson. Ling Hung's adopted son Kent Ling and his girlfriend Kate Wei are her think-tanks; whereas Yik Fung is her main bodyguard, but sometimes Ching Yan also fills in to protect Ling Hung.

Kent Ling was abandoned by his biological parents as a child leaving him on the streets and Ling Hung happened to be strolling by finding him in starvation and stopped him from trying to grab food from the garbage can and then she would find a note attached by his biological parents they could not care for him. Ling Hung had treated him to congee at a nearby food stand when she found him on the day of 10/23, which also is the same birthday as Tsz Kit and since then, that date became an important date for Ling Hung and Kent Ling including Ling Hung adopted Kent eventually, which initially was because of Ling Hung's guilt of giving up her own biological son, however she would eventually grow to love Kent as he was her own biological son and every year on 10/23 they would go to the same stand to eat the same congee to honor Ling Hung taking him into her care. However, after Tsz Kit came back into Ling Hung's life, Ling Hung decided to go to Tsz Kit's birthday party with Yik Fung providing the suggestion since this was Tsz Kit's first birthday of not having his adoptive mother with him to celebrate with this year, which resulted Ling Hung to inform Kent Ling she could not arrive to the Congee stand to celebrate their important date as well as the congee food stand owner was about to retire soon. Kent Ling, however still held out hope Ling Hung would still make a late arrival and Kate, Kent's girlfriend called to let Ling Hung know this, which Tsz Kit would find out about this and selflessly told her to go to the Congee stand to celebrate this important date with Kent, which Ling Hung did make the late arrival. When Kent Ling found out that Ling Hung went to Tsz Kit's birthday party and being unaware of Tsz Kit's true identity, he became suspicious of Tsz Kit's frequent appearance around Ling Hung, which caused conflict between him and Ling Hung. Kent was also suspicious when he learned that Ling Hung decided to hire Tsz Kit as her bodyguard and eventually hiring him to work as an information file storage manager at the company and wondered why Ling Hung hired Ching Yan, one of the most top professional assassin to protect Tsz Kit. Eventually Ling Hung reveals to Kent Ling that Tsz Kit is Ling Hung's biological son, which he was the first one in the family to find out. When Kent Ling eventually realizes Tsz Kit is a kind hearted charitable person who came into Ling Hung's life to help her out and to protect her having no intention of fighting for any of Ling Hung's inheritances, he begins to accept Tsz Kit and becoming one of Tsz Kit's closest family members and his relationship to Ling Hung is back to normal. The rest of Ling family would then eventually find out about Tsz Kit's relationship to Ling Hung and he is accepted into the family. Meanwhile, Ling Hung's affiliates are waiting for an opportunity to wreak havoc, putting her life in imminent danger. Though Ching-yan and Tsz-kit join forces to strike back, they trigger a new wave of bloodshed that is about to engulf the whole society....

In the beginning, when Tsz Kit was introduced into the family, he was not used to having such a large family, which involved his mother Ling Hung, his adoptive brother Kent Ling, his grandmother, his aunt Ling Hei and her husband Sunny, his uncle Lit and his wife Tina, and his cousins Ricky, Anthony, Chloe, and Kelly including Anthony's wife Hilda whom all are living in the same household in a large mansion. Tsz Kit eventually gets used to being part of a large wealthy family including having meals with them, but still preferred to have his own independent life even though he was living in the same household with his partners Ching Yan, Ling Hung's bodyguard Yik Fung and his friend G-Force and wanted to still live the simple life he once had in Taiwan as much as possible, except when he was on dangerous missions and never had any intentions of wanting any of the Ling family inheritances.  
 
Tsz Kit then slowly learns the underground business operations and then becomes a hit man in order to protect his mother and his close loved ones against rival mafias and gangs often being involved in gun battles teaming up with his former body guard now partner Ching Yan, his adoptive brother Kent Ling, and Kent's girlfriend Kate. Very often, Ling Hung is at another location utilizing her cell phone/technology behind the scenes in managing/ordering the dangerous missions for the team to battle against the rivalries. Normally Ling Hung's bodyguard Yik Fung and sometimes her sons and other bodyguards would be with her to protect her from violent gun battles, but there have been times she has had to defend herself with a gun and shoot against the rival gangs coming after her. Tsz Kit and Ching Yan slowly began to fall in love throughout Tsz Kit's time in the mafia society, although at first they were in denial despite the fact there were many occasions where they almost kissed and even one time they were almost tempted into having sex in the living room when there were a few condoms lying around thanks to his friend G Force accidentally leaving them around. Eventually, Tsz Kit and Ching Yan embrace their love and are found kissing each other in more than one occasions.

Throughout the series, some of Ling Hung's family members, which were her brother Lit, her nephews Ricky and Anthony, whom are also Lit's sons and her sister Ling Hei are shown to be corrupt and coming up with schemes often teaming up with the wrong kinds of people to gain profits and power for their greed including trying to take Ling Hung's chairperson position, which eventually caused all of them to be killed.

Ling Hung's biggest rival enemy has been Wei Lui for many years. Wei Lui with greed and desire for power and profits has many times attempted to bring Ling Hung down including even trying take over her chairperson seat in the mafia alliance. Despite their rivalry statuses, Ling Hung's adopted son Kent Ling and Wei Lui's daughter Kate are a couple with no disapproval from the Ling and Wei families. Kate often is the mediator between the Ling and Lui families and despite trying to have her father stop trying to fight with Ling Hung and warning this would lead to lives being hurt, he never listened until there was a tragedy in the family.

Tsz Kit was once an innocent average person in Taiwan, but after stepping into his mother's mafia society, he had to spend a lot of time learning how to make tough firm decisions when dealing with critical dangerous situations, which was not easy for him to learn and was still very soft-hearted and very forgiving even though he had corrupt family members that pose as dangerous threats to him and the rest of the Ling Family. Ling Hung, Ching Yan, and Kent Ling had to spend a lot of time teaching and reminding Tsz Kit of knowing how to be tough and firm even if it meant being ruthless when making decisions in dangerous moments. One time, Ling Hung discovered Ricky's selfish greedy decision to make profits with Johnny Cub, a Thailand mafia boss almost placed the lives of the Ling family and especially Tsz Kit in danger including Ricky's and also Tsz Kit's related young cousin Chloe being kidnapped by Johnny Cub, however Chloe was eventually rescued safely thanks to the efforts of Ling Hung, Tsz Kit, Kent, Kate, Ching Yan, Yik Fung and the rest of the crew coming in to rescue her, which involved Ling Hung with planting a bomb in a truck and blowing it up, which gave the whole crew a chance to shoot their guns against Johnny Cub's gang successfully including killing Johnny Cub. This resulted in Ling Hung giving Tsz Kit full familial authority to decide how to punish his cousin Ricky and reminded Tsz Kit again that he must know the game to be firm and tough in making prompt decisions when dealing with critical situations in the mafia society and this was Ling Hung's subliminal lesson to Tsz Kit that if someone has tried to hurt him especially if it placed his life and/or any of his loved ones in danger, to never hesitate to get revenge as needed, but because Tsz kit naturally always had a good heart who recently came from living an average normal life and was still very new in his mother's mafia society, he was unable to bring himself to do this and wanted to be forgiving being that Ricky was family and although Ling Hung had a more ruthless, likely deadlier intended punishment for Ricky, Ling Hung respected Tsz Kit's decision and instead made a much less harsher punishment, which was kicking Ricky out of the household and sent him to Taiwan. Ricky on his knees begged Ling Hung to let him have another chance and to not kick him out of the Ling family household, but because Ricky numerously have used harmful careless acts and getting involved with the wrong kinds of people; often Ling Hung's enemies to gain profits and never learning his lessons from them, Ling Hung stated to Ricky that he has been given so many chances already to correct and learn from his mistakes, but failed to do so and warned him to not force herself(Ling Hung) to have to make decisions she does not want to make.

Ricky became infuriated with Ling Hung's decision to kick him to Taiwan and later on would trick Ling Hung, Tsz Kit, Kent Ling, Ching Yan, and Yik Fung to come to Taiwan to supposedly save Ricky from danger, but in reality it was a set up to have a respected mafia boss Tin Yeh in Taiwan be killed and frame Ling Hung for it and then this resulted in the Taiwanese mafias and gangs going after them and trying to kill them, so Ricky can take over Ling Hung's chairperson position to gain profits and power. This resulted in them to have to be on the run in Taiwan having to defend themselves with guns against the assassins coming after them, which involved Ling Hung's bodyguard Yik Fung to be injured in his leg in the process and since it was not safe for them to go to a hospital as the mafias and gangs would be able to track them down, luckily Tsz Kit remembered a house his adoptive mother Mei owned in Taiwan where they went to hide and Ching Yan did the procedure to take out the bullet from Yik Fung's leg with Kent, Tsz Kit and Ling Hung holding him down as the procedure was very painful for Yik Fung and while in hiding at the house, Yik Fung was recovering in a separate room. It was revealed that Wei Lui and his sons Michael Wei and George Wei were involved with Ricky to lure Ling Hung to Taiwan to have her killed, but when Kate found out about this, she arrived to Taiwan and found out the house Kent, Ling Hung, Ching Yan, Tsz Kit, and Yik Fung were hiding in and it was her attempt to stop her brothers Michael and George who were in Taiwan already from continuing this attack against Ling Hung as they were found out to be involved with this with the help of their father Wei Lui. In that period, Kent and Kate not knowing if they will be alive or dead took the chance to informally get married with Tsz Kit and Ching Yan as the witnesses and Ling Hung drinking the honorary teas in the house they were hiding in and later on there is scene showing Kate and Kent just finished having sex and naked in the bedroom. However, the Taiwanese gangs were still after them eventually found out where they were hiding and there was an ambush once more and due to Ling Hung's bodyguard Yik Fung still recovering from his injuries, the beginning scene of the ambush at the house they were hiding in showed Ling Hung having to fend for herself with a gun and shot one of the assassins outside the window and Kent shooting another assassin charging into the room Ling Hung and Yik Fung were sleeping in and Kate is shown with a gun on her hand looking outside to see if anymore assassins are coming in, but most of the ambush taking place at the house as shown in the series was in the living room where Ching Yan and Tsz Kit were sleeping in showing Tsz Kit and Ching Yan fiercely repeatedly shooting at them. Ling Hung and Kate are shown arriving into the living room with guns on their hands surrounding and protecting Kent unable to use a gun at the moment due to the fact he had to carry the injured Yik Fung. As they were getting ready to escape, Ling Hung noticed another assassin coming in aiming the gun behind her son Tsz Kit who was unaware and then pushed Tsz Kit out of the way causing her to be grazed in her side torso, but Ching Yan shot and killed the assassin. Kate then took an extreme measure to save Ling Hung and everyone else by going to another Taiwanese mafia boss Lui Yeh, who was responsible for ordering the deaths of Ling Hung, Tsz Kit, Ching Yan, Yik Fung and Kent Ling to convince him it was a set up by her father and Ling Hung was not responsible for Tin Yeh's murder, but this involved her being held hostage resulting in Michael and George needing to come save her as they were already in Taiwan working with Ricky and Kent also came along to save Kate. Unfortunately, Michael and George are killed when trying to save Kate and Kent leaving their wives and children on their own in Hong Kong and leaving Wei Lui without a living son. Ching Yan was able to secretly record Ricky's conversation with a gangster who also wanted to set up Ling Hung to be killed and the conversation contained proof that Ling Hung was being framed and that Wei Lui was responsible for Tin Yeh's death, which the video was uploaded on the Taiwanese websites and then all of the Taiwanese gangs and mafias would find out and Lui Yeh calls off the set up to kill Ling Hung and her crew and even apologized to Ling Hung for the mistake. Therefore, Ricky was exposed for trying to have Ling Hung killed and despite given many chances to correct his wrongful actions, Ricky continued to aggressively pursue trying to kill Ling Hung in the house they were hiding in leaving Tsz Kit no choice but to bring his gun out to shoot and kill Ricky to save Ling Hung's life with Ching Yan grabbing Ling Hung out of the way. Tsz Kit became horrified and shocked he had to make this ruthless action to kill Ricky to save Ling Hung and was feeling very guilty being Ricky was family, but Ling Hung, Ching Yan and Kent Ling reminded him this was the only and best option otherwise Ricky would have continued to be a dangerous threat to the Ling family and never would have learned from his mistakes being that Ricky was very greedy with wanting power and profits.

Ling Hung, Tsz Kit, Kent, Kate, Ching Yan and Yik Fung return to Hong Kong from Taiwan and then had to break the news to the Ling family that Ricky was dead. Ricky's father Ling Lit would eventually find out about how his son was killed, but did not believe the truth about Ricky wanting set up Ling Hung to be killed, which then resulted in Ling Lit wanting to separate from the Ling family and teaming up with a corrupt politician Lau Zak Sing to benefit himself profitably and power-wise including attempting to kill Ling Hung, Kent Ling and Tsz Kit to avenge his son's death, which failed and instead Ling Lit is killed himself in an explosion set up by Lau Zak Sing with the help of a secret mafia boss named Rain Man. Tsz Kit slowly began to be more tough like Ling Hung with making firm decisions in handling dangerous situations and people; although at times he can be more extreme and ruthless than Ling Hung with his measures to manage dangerous enemies, but he still continued to retain his charitable good personality when it came to family and average people.

Throughout the series, Ling Hung was shown trying to use her power to try to work with a good hearted politician Lee Tit Ngok to wipe out the corrupting and criminal businesses in Hong Kong and wanted to slowly leave the mafia life and do good deeds as a way to correct her past mistake of stepping into the mafia society accidentally, which had caused a lot of offense against the society of Hong Kong in the past and although Ling Hung made many attempts to work with Lee Tit Ngok, there was big barrier due to Rain Man, one of the most top secret mysterious behind the scenes mafia bosses who controls almost all of the underground illegal business activities and gang ambushes in Hong Kong finding out about this, which meant Ling Hung had decided to unknowingly go against Rain Man. As a result, Rain Man created situations that would either target her and/or her family members including members of her alliance, such as attempted ambushes against Ling Hung or manipulative setups to have her family members who were greedy for profits/power and members of her alliance to turn against Ling Hung. Of the ambushes that took place, one of them was when Ling Hung, Kent and Yik Fung attempted to meet with Lee Tit Ngok at a hotel to discuss how to make Hong Kong a better society and despite the fact they used careful procedures to keep the meeting a secret to avoid allowing other mafia bosses to know, Rain Man having heavy surveillance on the Ling family found out about this and stopped the meeting from happening with assassins dressed as hotel workers ambushing them, but luckily Kent and Yik Fung protected Ling Hung and fired their guns against the assassins. Coincidentally this ambush happened at the same time of when Tsz Kit and Mei were ambushed in Taiwan, but with Ching Yan protecting Tsz Kit also arranged by Rain Man. There was also another attempted ambush later on arranged by Rain Man against politician Lee Tit Ngo at a hospital, but was never injured thanks to Tsz Kit, Ching Yan and Kent along with their crew on scene protecting him and shooting their guns against the assassins trying to target Lee Tit Ngok. Very often, a corrupt politician Lau Zak Sing including Wei Lui, Ling Hung's long time enemy were involved with all of these situations as well.

Later on, in one of the final episodes of the series, Ling Hung and the rest of the Ling family would find out the person to be Rain Man was Kam Tin, a corrupt police official and would also find out Kam Tin is the one who has been creating these attempted ambushes or manipulative setups targeting Ling Hung. Wei Lui who realized his mistake of constantly trying to go after Ling Hung, which resulted in his sons being killed had decided to work with Rain Man who he could only communicate with on phone initially and Rain Man was using a disguised voice. Wei Lui's real intention was to try to figure out Rain Man's identity and bring this person down to make up for what he did to his sons as it is revealed Rain Man was also involved in his sons being killed in Taiwan along with controlling almost all of the criminal and ambush activities happening in Hong Kong. Eventually when Wei Lui had a chance to speak to Rain Man in the same room with walls separating them both and with Rain Man still using a disguised voice, he was able to figure out it was Kam Tin due to the fact that Rain Man made a statement that strongly resembled Kam Tin's statement to him years ago when he was in a shootout war against Ling Hung, there was a set up to have him not killed in the shootout as a way to balance out the power between Ling Hung and the mafia alliance. Kent, Kate, Ching Yan and Tsz Kit attempted to save Wei Lui from Kam Tin, however before they could save him, Wei Lui is shot and killed when he discovered Rain Man's real identity, but left a clue with his blood on Tsz Kit's arm before he died, which led them to realize it was a top police official and then Ling Hung would figure out Rain Man is Kam Tin.

Since Ling Hung refused to give up trying to clean up the mafia corruption system in Hong Kong and wanting to try to leave the mafia business slowly, Kam Tin would not stand for this, which would result in Kam Tin escalating manipulative deadly threats against her family members as a way to try to wipe out Ling Hung. Tsz Kit's aunt Ling Hei and his cousin Anthony being greedy for profits and power took advantage of the situation by creating a plot to try to force Ling Hung into signing over her power rights to her assets and the powerful corporate business over to them. Anthony revealed to Ling Hei that his father Lit had bought a poison potion from the black market years earlier in case Lit decided to use it one day to kill Ling Hung to gain access to her business and profits. Anthony's plan was to add the poison into Ling Hung's drink or food when the right opportunity comes, which would cause her to have heart attack like symptoms and to use that opportunity to try to make Ling Hung sign her power rights to her assets and her corporate business over to them and if she complied, she would be given an antidote or if she did not comply, she would be left to die either way as a chance for them to gain profits/power for their greedy needs in addition they would have the power to decide to not go against Rain Man and the mafia system of Hong Kong as their supposedly theoretical thinking to end Rain Man's vendetta against the Ling family. Ling Hei went along with Anthony's plan and one morning, Anthony added the poison into Ling Hung's soybean drink during breakfast to go on with this plan. However, this plot failed as the Ling family all discovered Ling Hei's and Anthony's tactics as Yik Fung, Ling Hung's bodyguard had recorded their conversation to poison Ling Hung, including that Ling Hung, Tsz Kit and Kent Ling tested them out by asking them that one of them should drink Ling Hung's glass of soybean milk, which contained the poison intended for Ling Hung and this would lead to their exposures of this attempt to kill Ling Hung. Tsz Kit even attempted to pour the poisoned soybean milk into Anthony's mouth as a warning to him. At this moment, Tsz Kit's tough mafia behavior has been slowly becoming more intense as he has experienced so many dangerous situations including losing his adoptive mother Mei and much later on his best friend G Force to mafia violence. Kent Ling then made a statement in that moment that the poison tumor must be eliminated immediately, which the expression means if there is a family member who is a potential dangerous threat to the family household, that person must be eliminated immediately, which likely meant death or more lives would be hurt. However, Ling Hung forgave them and gave them another chance after hearing pleas from other family members to not eliminate them.

Ling Hung decided to end their very large corporate business they have had for many years, which actually was built up based on resources from the underground illegal businesses Ling Hung was involved with for many years. Ling Hung hoped this would be a way to leave the mafia business and to lead to a more simpler lifestyle, however Tsz Kit's aunt Ling Hei and cousin Anthony refused to accept this reality and being they wanted to continue to live the luxurious lifestyle they have had for so long and wanted power/profits, they formed their plot again in the final episode to kill Ling Hung to take over the business for their benefit to gain power/profits by trying to get in touch with Rain Man to help out, which Tsz Kit discovered on time and then at that moment Tsz Kit's ruthless tough mafia demeanor becomes even more intensely vicious, blood thirsty and unforgiving than Ling Hung ever was and this time he created a set up including playing games with them to sentence them to their deaths. Although Tsz Kit's mother had ordered him to bring Anthony and Ling Hei back to let Ling Hung punish them her way without violence because they are family, Tsz Kit who was now blood thirsty for Ling Hei and Anthony ignored Ling Hung's orders and unforgivably ruthlessly decided their punishment should be death, which he successfully accomplished. Tsz Kit devised a plan to have Ling Hung go into a safe shelter in hiding as it was revealed Rain Man had hired very high skilled professional assassins from mainland China meant to target Ling Hung and knowing that Ling Hei had heavy surveillance on Ling Hung's location and made attempts to contact Rain Man to kill Ling Hung, Tsz Kit created a set up to fool Ling Hei into thinking Ling Hung was kidnapped by Rain Man's henchmen, then in which Ling Hei went into Ling Hung's company office to create a false contract stating Ling Hung had signed over the rights of the company to her including even forging Ling Hung's signature, but Anthony walked in and threatened her with a gun into redoing the contract to have the company inherited to him, which Ling Hei did out of no choice and then tried to kill Anthony with a letter opener, but Anthony overpowered her and grabbed the letter opener stabbing and killing Ling Hei. Anthony then brings in the false contract stating he is now the head chairperson of the company into the meeting room with the rest of the alliance members, which were expecting Ling Hung to be at the meeting due to the fact Tsz Kit had posted a false meeting notice to the mafia public that Ling Hung was setting up the meeting with them as a way to fool Rain Man into thinking Ling Hung was going to be at the meeting and Tsz Kit knew that Rain Man would devise a sneaky set up to kill Ling Hung in the meeting room, but since Tsz Kit was so furious to find out Anthony and Ling Hei were trying to get Rain Man's help to kill Ling Hung, Tsz Kit wanting to protect Ling Hung made sure it was either Ling Hei or Anthony or both of them to fall into Rain Man's trap to be killed including he wanted the rest of the alliance members to fall into this trap since he knew how much they wanted to take down or kill Ling Hung to take over her chairperson seat and gain power, which was accomplished as Rain Man did set up a secret poison gas in the meeting room meant for Ling Hung, which killed all of the alliance members including Anthony, however Ling Hei was already killed by Anthony and placed into the trunk of his car. It is revealed Tsz Kit had bribed a telecommunications staff into exclusively redirecting all of Ling Hei's and Anthony's communication messages meant for Rain Man to Tsz Kit's cell phone, which is how Tsz Kit was able to figure out all of Ling Hei's and Anthony's plans to kill Ling Hung. At this point, the personality roles between Tsz Kit and Ling Hung switched where Tsz Kit is now making more extreme ruthless decisions and Ling Hung has become more soft-hearted. Ling Hung was devastated and in heavy tears by and questioned Tsz Kit's ruthless cold actions especially on why he did not stop Ling Hei's and Anthony's evil plans and bring them back to allow Ling Hung to manage the punishment for them and to give them another chance to correct their mistakes, however Tsz Kit responded that he knew that Ling Hung would be too soft-hearted to give an appropriate fair punishment to Anthony and Ling Hei and that they would have become more ruthlessly greedy with wanting power and profit including continuously pursuing to try killing Ling Hung to gain profit and power and would never learn from their mistakes. Tsz Kit also stated to Ling Hung and Kent Ling he will not stand to let his own mother along with any other innocent family members to die no matter what he has to do to protect them. Tsz Kit also bluntly said, if he was given another chance to handle the situation with Ling Hei and Anthony again, he would make the same decisions. Ling Hung responded with words saying he was ruthlessly conniving and too extreme and evil-spirited. Tsz Kit then reminded Ling Hung it was her who taught him to be firm and tough in making prompt decisions in critical dangerous moments in the mafia society. Ling Hung and Kent Ling whom were involved in the conversation with Tsz Kit over his ruthless actions started realizing and became too overwhelmingly and terrifyingly horrified and shocked as seen on their faces with guilt and fear that Tsz Kit who was once one of the most warm hearted easily forgiving member who was often more of a Peace maker as harmless as an Angel of the Ling family now have seemingly quickly turned into the most ruthless terrifying vicious blood thirsty Mafia as dangerous as the Devil/Satan of the Ling family who will now unforgivably and notoriously go to any extreme ruthless lengths to eliminate anyone who turns against or is a threat to the Ling family in any form. Ling Hung reacted almost in wanting to slap Tsz Kit for his vicious ruthless actions, but when she realized Tsz Kit was right about her teaching him to be firm and tough in the mafia society, she turned her hands and slapped herself and then fell to her knees in heavy tears feeling guilty and responsible that she turned Tsz Kit from an innocent warm-hearted easily forgiving person who was living a normal life to being a ruthless vicious cold unforgiving blood thirsty triad. Tsz Kit and Kent Ling started to tear up seeing Ling Hung's devastation and tried comforting Ling Hung and Tsz Kit even tried to tell her it is not her fault, but Ling Hung was too terrifyingly horrified and guilty to see what Tsz Kit has become as if she saw Lucifer took possession of Tsz Kit and pushed him away and Kent Ling brought her back into her bedroom to recuperate her emotions.

It was revealed that Kam Tin, a corrupt police official is Rain Man, which is a name given to her to keep her identity a secret who is in a more higher ranking mafia position and has been pulling the strings controlling almost all of the illegal businesses and gang ambushes in Hong Kong and has been after Ling Hung and her entire family. Tsz Kit and his adopted brother Kent along with his team were able to expose Kam Tin as Rain Man, resulting in her identity no longer being a secret to the public. They were nearly successful in having Kam Tin captured by the authorities, but Kam Tin escaped through a slim chance and eventually she sets up an attempt to have her henchmen kidnap Ling Hung, which would cause Ling Hung's bodyguard Yik Fung to be killed in the process when he tried to save her. Kent Ling and his team of assassins are then forced to rescue Ling Hung, but it involved them and Ling Hung having to be in a very deadly gun battle against Kam Tin's henchmen and unfortunately Kent Ling's team are all killed in the process. Meanwhile, Tsz Git finds out who the most richest top Hong Kong mafia bosses are that gave Kam Tin the position to be Rain Man and with the incriminating evidence Tsz Kit had against Kam Tin, which also included involvement with these higher up mafia bosses along with proof that Kam Tin wanted to eventually betray them with the evidence she kept on them and since Kam Tin's secret identity as Rain Man was now exposed, he manages to convince the much higher up mafia bosses of Hong Kong to have Kam Tin's henchmen turn their guns against her executing Kam Tin to her death successfully saving Ling Hung and Kent Ling. Equivalent to Mei's attempt many years earlier to try to save Ling Hung and have her leave the mafia business, which unfortunately was a temporary success, Tsz Kit willingly took over the position as Rain Man working for them, being in one of the highest ranking ruthless mafia positions in Hong Kong far surpassing the highest status position Ling Hung has ever held in the mafia society. The motive was to save his mother and get her and the whole Ling family to leave the dangerous underground business safely to a normal simple safer life, which proved to be permanently successful this time unlike Mei's attempt many years ago. Including that Tsz Kit wanted to use the opportunity to get evidence to expose the most top Hong Kong mafia bosses of their illegal doings to prevent them from doing more harm to the Hong Kong society.

Two years later, Ling Hung, her mother, her two nieces Chloe and Kelly, Kent and Kate has relocated to the rural areas. Kate is also pregnant with Kent’s child. Ching Yan traveler who makes visits to the family often and still believe that there is a chance Tsz Kit is still alive. Meanwhile, Tsz Kit has been working as Rainman for the past 2 years, gaining the trust of the mafia bosses before revealing to them he has exposed their criminal deeds for the world to see. As Tsz Kit left, he reunites with Ching Yan outside.

Cast and characters

The Ling Family
Nina Paw as Ling Hung (令熊), a powerful businesswoman who runs several international syndicates across the world. To protect her son from falling into the hands of her enemies, she sends him to Taiwan, where he is raised by a foster mother. Her role is likened to the Chinese female Wu Zetian and Vito Corleone from The Godfather.
Ruco Chan as Ko Tsz-kit (高子杰), Ling Hung's biological son, who was raised in Taiwan. He goes on a search for his true parentage after surviving an assassination attempt. In a grand plan to fool Rainman and gain her trust, Kit takes over as temporary president of the Union while keeping a ruse that she has divided the family apart. To ultimately save his mother and Kent, he replaces Kam Tin as Rainman and spends the next two years taking down Hong Kong's corruption before returning home to his remaining loved ones.
Nancy Wu as Naka Yuen Ching-yan (阮清欣), Tsz-kit's bodyguard, who poses as a backpacker when she first meets him. Yan is actually sent by Ling Hung to protect him. She was born in a village located in the northern part of Thailand. She was trained to be a killing machine at her childhood.
Joel Chan as Kent Ling Tsin-yau (令千佑), Ling Hung's adopted son who was picked up on the day of Ling Hung's son Tsz-Kit's birthday. Despite knowing that Kit is his mother's illegitimate son, he does not hold any hard feelings and gets along with him well.
Elaine Yiu as Kate Wei Yi-yau (韋以柔), Kent's girlfriend, and is in charge of public relations at Ling Hung's company. She is the youngest daughter of the Wei family, the enemy family of Ling Hung.
Kwok Fung as Wei Lui (韋磊), Kate's father.  Rival/Enemy of Ling Hung indirectly cause his two sons' death  seeks redemption in near the finale by sacrificing himself to reveal the identity of Rainman
Jimmy Au as Yik Fung (易風), Ling Hung's bodyguard and trustworthy friend.  Died in the finale while protecting Ling Hung from Rainman's henchmen
KK Cheung as Ling Lit (令烈), Ling Hung and Ling Hei's younger brother. Died in a car explosion cause by Rainman's henchmen.
Mary Hon as Ling Hei (令熹), Ling Hung and Ling Lit's sister.  Killed by Antony in the finale to get hold of Ling corporation.
Pierre Ngo as Ricky Ling Chi-sin (令智煽), Ling Lit's younger son  Shot to dead in self-defense by Ko Tsz-kit in Taiwan for plotting to kill Ling Hung with no remorse after his plotting with the Lui family was exposed.
Lam Tsz-sin (Jazz Lam) as Anthony Ling Ka-ming (令家名), Ling Lit's older son  Killed by poison gas set by Rainman for Ling Hung, which he became a scapegoat caused by Ko Tsz-kit in the finale.
Roxanne Tong as Kelly Law Ho-man (羅皓雯), Ling Hei's older daughter.
Bella Lam as Chloe Law Ho-yee (羅皓兒), Ling Hei's younger daughter.

Recurring cast
Griselda Yeung as Tina, Ling Lit's wife
Becky Lee as Hilda, Ling Ka-ming/Anthony's wife  has an affair with Ling Chi-sin
Carlo Ng as Sunny, Ling Hei's husband
Oscar Leung as G-Force, Ko Tsz-Kit's best friend
Man Yeung as Wei Lui's older son/Michael  Died with his younger brother in Taiwan when trying to save his younger sister, Kate
Mandy Lam as Wei Lui's older son's wife, Wei Lui's older daughter-in-law
Stefan Wong as Wei Lui's younger son/George  Die with his older brother in Taiwan when trying to save his younger sister, Kate
Kimmy Kwan as Wei Lui's younger son's wife, Wei Lui's younger daughter-in-law
Stephen Wong Hong Kong Police Inspector
Lily Leung as Ling Hung's mother
Elena Kong as Kam Tin also known as 'Rainman', Hong Kong's Chairman of the Criminal Justice Committee.  Controls Hong Kong's corrupted police officers and blackmails high position officials supported by four corrupted greedy richest men in Hong Kong.  Killed by her henchman on the order of her behind scene bosses after she is no longer useful to them since her identity was exposed to the public.
Chloe Yuen (阮兒) in flashback, as Ling Hung's best friend and body double; introduced in Ep.6
Candice Chiu in flashback, as young Ling Hung

Production and casting
Producer Jazz Boon had always wanted to do a kung fu-themed production. After the commercial success of his 2014 television drama Line Walker, Boon was finally given the opportunity to conceive his own kung fu story with 2016's A Fist Within Four Walls. Boon had strong chemistry with the A Fist Within Four Walls cast. Halfway into filming the drama, he started working on The Unholy Alliance with his Four Walls cast in mind.

The Unholy Alliance was officially announced in mid-August 2016. The Hong Kong media regarded it as a "modern" version of Boon's A Fist Within Four Walls, which was set in the 1960s. Four Walls leads Ruco Chan and Nancy Wu were the first cast members to be announced for The Unholy Alliance in August 2016. Paw Hee-ching, who was in negotiations with TVB since March 2016, was announced next. The Unholy Alliance is Paw's first TVB production.

Lam Tsz-sin, Elaine Yiu, Joel Chan, Oscar Leung, and Bella Lam were confirmed to be part of the cast days later. Four Walls actors Grace Wong and Benjamin Yuen were invited to star, but declined the offer due to schedule clashes. The action choreographer for The Unholy Alliance was announced to be Philip Kwok, who also choreographed Four Walls.

On 24 July 2017, the opening theme video was released.

References

External links
The Unholy Alliance Official TVB website 

TVB dramas
Hong Kong television series
Hong Kong action television series
2010s Hong Kong television series
Martial arts television series